Alejandro de Castro y Casal (23 April 1812 in A Coruña, Spain – 6 July 1881 in Zarauz, Spain) was a Spanish politician who served as Minister of State and as President of the Congress of Deputies.

|-
 

|-
 

1812 births
1881 deaths
People from A Coruña
Moderate Party (Spain) politicians
19th-century Spanish politicians
Conservative Party (Spain) politicians
Economy and finance ministers of Spain
Foreign ministers of Spain
Government ministers of Spain
Presidents of the Congress of Deputies (Spain)
Members of the Congress of Deputies of the Spanish Restoration
Members of the Senate of Spain
Politicians from Galicia (Spain)